A taunt is a battle cry, sarcastic remark, gesture, or insult intended to demoralize the recipient, or to anger them and encourage reactionary behaviors without thinking. Taunting can exist as a form of social competition to gain control of the target's cultural capital (i.e., status). In sociological theory, the control of the three social capitals is used to produce an advantage in the social hierarchy, so as to enforce one's own position in relation to others. Taunting is committed by either directly or indirectly encouraging others to taunt the target. The target may give a response in kind to maintain status, as in fighting words and trash-talk.

Taunts are also a genre of folklore.

Verbal taunts
The act of taunting can be learned by observation and improvisation. It usually follows linear thought, correlating or building in some manner to the target of taunting. Things such as the victim's appearance, intelligence, mannerisms, education, background, past offences, etc. can otherwise be insulted. When used in this manner, the effectiveness of a taunt at provoking a response varies depending on how the specific insult relates to its victim (or their sense of self), to what level of offence they regard the taunt, and how well the victim can control their emotions when responding.

In the Eastern U.S. and modern Britain the chant "Nyah nyah nyah nyah nyah nyah", sung to the tune of "Bye, baby Bunting" is insult among children. In the American South this is often used as "Nanny nanny boo-boo" and repeated with words such as "You ca-an't catch me". In Hebrew, the taunt is "Na na, banana" or "Na-na-na banana" (means the same as in English). In French, the taunt uses syllables often rendered "Nananananère," and Swedish-speaking children use the phrase "Du kan inte ta mig" ("You cannot catch me"). In Croatia, children sing in that tune: "Ulovi me, ulovi me, kupit ću ti novine. Novine su skupe, poljubi me u dupe.", which means: "Catch me, catch me, [if you do that] I'll buy you a newspaper. Newspapers are pricey, kiss my tushie."

Gestures

Certain movements of one's body are, in many cultures, interpreted as a taunt. These can be expressed through the eyes, hands, fingers, head and other areas of the body.

Akanbe

A gesture in Japanese culture, made by pulling a lower eyelid down to expose the red underneath.

Clenched fist
A raised, clenched fist is used as a gesture of defiance by a number of groups. It is usually considered to be hostile, yet without any sexual, scatological, or notionally offensive connotations.

Crotch-grab
The crotch-grab is done almost exclusively by males. It is, as the name suggests, a grabbing (or one-handed cupping and lifting) of the penis and testicles -   usually through clothing. In Italy the sign is by no means purely a taunt, being also an apotropaic gesture of considerable antiquity employed, since the days of Ancient Rome, to ward off the evil eye or bad luck and also to attract good luck. It is, in this context, an invocation of the benign powers of fertility embodied in the male genitalia and, as such, lies at the root of the magical intent expressed symbolically in the fascinum and probably also the cornicello. Despite recent prudish rulings by the Italian legal system, the (public) crotch-grab is still resorted to by more traditionally-minded Italian men as a means of deflecting the ill-luck threatened by objects or people related to death and burial and (more esoterically) the unlucky number 17 (said to be unlucky because it a) resembles a man hanging from a gibbet and b) because when written XVII in Roman numerals is an anagram of 'vixi' - 'I lived', a verb form considered unlucky because of its frequent occurrence in ancient Roman funerary inscriptions).

Cutthroat
The cutthroat gesture is performed by drawing the hand, or a finger or two, across the throat. It represents slitting the throat with a knife, and means that the gesturer or someone else is metaphorically being killed. It is rarely if ever used literally to refer to death (and when the whole hand is used, it is usually a benign signal to stop or pause something), though it is occasionally used as a theatrical threat ("I'm going to kill you"). The gesture earned a great deal of national notoriety in the NFL during the 1999 season in which several players did the cutthroat gesture.

The finger

The finger gesture is a gesture consisting of a fist with the middle finger extended. It is universally understood as "fuck you" due to its resemblance to the penis. It is certainly thousands of years old, being referred to in Ancient Roman literature as the digitus infamis or digitus impudicus. Performing this gesture is also called "flipping the bird" in countries where "the finger" is used. In other regions, "flipping the bird" refers to the raising of the middle and index finger with the back of the hand directed at the recipient. It can also mean "Victor" in some countries, which is not to be mistaken for the "Peace" gesture. The "Peace" gesture is done with the palm facing the recipient of the gesture. In Britain, this is also the case; however, if the palm faces inwards (towards the person doing the "peace" sign), it is an offensive gesture in Britain, though not considered quite as rude as "the finger".

Loser

The "loser" gesture used in some countries is performed by raising the index finger and thumb of one's right hand perpendicular to each other and then placing them on one's forehead with index finger pointing upward. So placed, the fingers form the letter "L" from the perspective of a viewer and signify the name-calling insult "loser" directed toward the person being spoken to or spoken about.

Shocker

Done by holding up the hand with the index, middle and pinky finger, implying the act of putting two fingers in a woman's vagina and one in her anus.

Tongue
Often sticking one's tongue out at another is seen as mocking the other. A variation of this is also known as blowing a raspberry. It can also be wagged in a manner suggesting cunnilingus, which is usually seen as highly vulgar.

Turkey face
The turkey face gesture is when you take your hand and put your thumb on your nose, wriggle your head back and forth and do the same thing with the hand. Cocking a snook is an old British taunting gesture in which the thumb of one hand is on the nose and the extended fingers are wiggled.

V sign

The insulting version of the gesture (with the palm inwards) is often compared to the offensive gesture known as "the finger". The "two-fingered salute", as it is also known, is commonly performed by flicking the V upwards from wrist or elbow. The V sign, when the palm is facing toward the person giving the sign, has long been an insulting gesture in England, and later in the rest of the United Kingdom; its use is largely restricted to the UK, Ireland, Australia, and New Zealand. It is frequently used to signify defiance (especially to authority), contempt or derision.

Wanker

The wanker gesture is made with a loose fist (with all fingers forming a cylindrical shape), and shaken up and down (or sometimes, back and forth) at the wrist, suggesting masturbation.
A picture of the young Tony Blair, later the British Prime Minister (1997–2007), using the wanker gesture became widely available (although copyrighted) in 2007.

In popular culture

In the 1975 Monty Python film Monty Python and the Holy Grail, the French Knight taunts King Arthur and his companions with a series of increasingly ludicrous insults, culminating in "Your mother was a hamster and your father smelt of elderberries".

Versions of the Endemol quiz show 1 vs. 100 based on the United States version (Australia, and to an extent, France) are known for the contestants and mob taunting each other.

Similar game shows, such as Weakest Link, are built on taunting a defeated player.

Video games

Some video games feature the ability to taunt an opponent. In the context of role-playing games, a "taunt" command is often used by the tank to draw the AI opponents' attention to the player's character, saving other more fragile characters from its attacks so that they can perform specialized roles. In a first-person shooter context or 1-on-1 games, a "taunt" command is essentially a virtual incarnation of a verbal taunt, and may include either purpose-programmed sounds and gestures or a symbolic ritual insult that players have adopted to show dominance.  In the context of wrestling or fighting games, a taunt may serve the purpose of building energy or stamina.

In games not featuring a dedicated "taunt" command, players have devised other ways, using the controls of the game, to taunt or harass opponents of other skill levels. In a racing game, for example, a player far in the lead might come to a stop before the finish line to watch their competitors begin to catch up, only to accelerate again and take the checkered flag when the opponents draw near. Multiplayer FPS games have given rise to the practice of corpse humping or tea bagging, which involves the "crouch" command present in a typical FPS's control scheme. In FPS games which allow hand-to-hand attacks, another common way of taunting opponents is to kill an opponent while one is not armed with a gun, through the use of some sort of melee attack such as a punch or knifing. Quake III Arena makes this form of "taunting" explicit by having the announcer loudly call out "Humiliation!" whenever a player is killed by another player's gauntlet.

In the MMORPG World of Warcraft, the classes of Warrior and Druid have the ability named "Taunt" and "Growl" respectively and used to focus the attack of an enemy non-player character (NPC) onto the Warrior or Druid who have used this ability. These classes also have an ability which focuses the attacks of all creatures in an area, commonly referred to as Area of Effect taunt (AOE). The Warrior ability is called "Challenging shout" and the Druid ability is called "Challenging roar". The Paladin and Death Knight classes possess taunts as well. Taunting isn't limited to game skills — it exists also as an emote by typing /taunt in the game's chat feature. This variant of taunting has also been featured in turn-based RPGs, such as Star Wars: Galaxy of Heroes, in which tank characters can taunt to force all enemies to attack them, while having the health and/or defense to withstand all such attacks so that allies can avoid every attack except area of effect attacks for a limited number of turns.

In the Super Smash Bros. series, characters have a brief taunt that can be performed by pressing a button. 4 characters possess taunts capable of dealing damage: Luigi in all games, Solid Snake in Brawl and Ultimate, Greninja in Super Smash Bros 4 and Ultimate, and Kazuya in Ultimate. Kirby's taunts remove his current Copy Ability. Since Super Smash Bros. Brawl, characters have had 3 different taunts each. If a Down Taunt is executed very quickly, Star Fox characters, Pit, and Solid Snake can contact allies on their home stages (known as a Smash Taunt), while (in Brawl), Samus Aran can remove her power suit if the Up and Down taunts are repeated very quickly.

In the online game Team Fortress 2, each character possesses a unique taunt depending on the weapon he is holding. An example of this is when the Demoman lifts his crotch armor to reveal a piece of paper with a smiley-face on it, shouting "Ka-BOOM!". Some taunts can kill opponents, and two can restore health. There are also special taunts, including some that require a partner to execute, that can be obtained as items.

In the Saints Row games, players can design their own character and choose from numerous taunts in order to make their enemies or pedestrians feel bad, thus engaging in a fist fight. This feature is also available in the second game, now that the character has the ability to speak in which they can trash-talk their pedestrians and enemy gangs nearby. Performing taunts will earn the player respect.

In MotorStorm game, drivers can perform taunts to other drivers in order to humiliate them. These can be performed by any vehicle the player derives, but so do other rivals. In MotorStorm: Pacific Rift, the use of taunt has been expanded upon and these are done by performing the infamous "the finger" next to another driver. Other taunts can be performed. However, doing this can make the rival attack the player, thus causing the player to crash.

In some Pokémon games, there is a Dark-type move called Taunt. Once it has been used, it only allows the user's opponent to use moves that can inflict damage instead of using moves that affect stats, status, weather, etc.

In The Secret of Monkey Island, the main character learns taunts and retorts in a process called insult sword fighting. The learned retorts are used to counter a second set of taunts later. The sequels feature several similar insult games.

In Heroes of Newerth, users who pre-purchased before the open beta began can use the ability "Taunt" to possibly score a "smackdown" announcement. It happens when the taunting player lands the killing blow on the taunted target. However, if the taunted target kills the taunter, a "HUMILIATION" announcement is displayed.

In Mirror's Edge, the main character can pull the V sign if the player executes a certain input combination on their controller.

In Grand Theft Auto V and Grand Theft Auto Online, the protagonists can pull the finger to the pedestrians when driving a vehicle while unarmed.

In the Dragon Ball fighting game Dragon Ball: Xenoverse, "Taunt" is a Super Skill used to force enemies to lock-on to the user turning the opponent's attention to the user. When performed, the user places their hands on the sides of their head and make faces while dancing from side-to-side.

In Watch Dogs 2 and Red Dead Redemption 2, the player can insult NPCs and trigger angry responses from them.

See also
 Insult
Jibe
 Sarcasm
 Social psychology
 Teasing
 The dozens
 Trash-talk
Slap in the face

References

Human behavior
Abuse